Geoffrey Roberts (born 1952) is a British historian of World War II working at University College Cork. He specializes in Soviet diplomatic and military history of World War II. He was professor of modern history at University College Cork (UCC) in Ireland and head of the School of History at UCC.

Early life and career 
Roberts was born in Deptford, South London, in 1952. As undergraduate, he studied international relations at North Staffordshire Polytechnic and was a postgraduate research student at the London School of Economics. Roberts is a fellow of the Royal Historical Society, and taught history and international relations at University College Cork.

A commentator on history and current affairs, Roberts has been a regular speaker in Britain, Ireland, Russia, and the United States and a contributor to the History News Service. He has appeared on radio and television and has acted as an historical consultant for documentary series such as Simon Berthon's Warlords, which was broadcast in 2005 on Channel 4. Academic awards won by Roberts include a Fulbright Scholarship to Harvard University and a Government of Ireland Senior Research Fellowship.

In 2013, the Society for Military History awarded the Distinguished Book Award to his Stalin's General: The Life of Georgy Zhukov (2012), a work which Jonathan Yardley for The Washington Post described as "what is likely to stand for some time as the most comprehensive biography of Zhukov."

In 2015, Roberts' Stalin's Wars: From World War to Cold War, 1939–1953, which was first published in 2006 by Yale University Press, was apparently banned from Sorbonne University because of alleged neutrality issue after an online petition asked the university to stock the French version of the work. Roberts was surprised by it, and commented, "It's never happened before. It's a work of scholarship. It has some very strong opinions, not everyone agrees with it, but to characterise it the way they've characterised it is completely wrong.... There can be no reason for an academic library to prohibit the purchase of Les Guerres de Staline, except political prejudice."

Views 
In an interview with George Mason University's History News Network following the publication of Stalin's General: The Life of Georgy Zhukov, Roberts said: "As I argued in Stalin's Wars and again in Stalin's General, it was (ironically) Stalin and the Soviets who helped saved  liberal democracy, as well as the communist system, from the Nazis."

About the Soviet Union, of which he was a critic in his youth, he commented "I retain the liberal and democratic ethos that informed my critique of Soviet authoritarianism." Roberts stated that it was "responsible for some of the most epic achievements and most gross misdeeds of our age" and said he had "no difficulty in joining the condemnation of the Soviet system's violence, terror and repression."

Roberts said he was"a great admirer of much of [Timothy D.] Snyder's work" and commended Bloodlands for telling "an important part of the story, but I don't see it as the whole picture." Expressing disagreement with Snyder's equating Nazi Germany with the Soviet Union, Roberts commented, "It's a pity Snyder's work has become associated with the recent revival of Cold War ideological polemics in which Hitler and Stalin and the Soviet and Nazi systems are depicted as being equivalent and as bad as each other."

Reception 
In a review for Stalin's Wars: From World War to Cold War, 1939–1953, the history professor Jonathan Haslam wrote that Cold War politics and historical revisionism "caused historians to emphasize Stalin's ruthlessness and paranoia while downplaying his contribution to the war effort." Roberts posited that "the contemporaneous view of Stalin as a great war leader was largely justified. Without minimizing Stalin's mistakes or his paranoia, the author maintains that the dictator was a key factor in the Soviet victory."

Roberts also wrote: "Without him the efforts of the [Communist] party, the people, the armed forces and their generals would have been considerably less effective."

In a 1996 article for The Journal of Modern History, Haslam criticized Roberts for relying too heavily on edited Soviet archival documents and for going too far in his conclusions, positing that this made his accounts somewhat one sided and by no means telling a full story. Vladimir Pechatov also reviewed Roberts' work in the Journal of Cold War Studies.

In a review about the same work for The National Interest, the historian Andrew Bacevich described it as "a model of scholarship" but criticized the depiction of Stalin "as great statesman and man of peace" and posited that Roberts was being overly sympathetic towards Stalin, taking the word of the Soviet leadership uncritically in his writings, presenting a biased view, and significantly undermining the usefulness of his scholarship. Roberts described Stalin as "the dictator who defeated Hitler and helped save the world for democracy."

Published works 
  See also the 1990 edition via Internet Archive.

Notes

References

External links 
 Official website
 Articles by Geoffrey Roberts

1952 births
Academics of University College Cork
Alumni of the London School of Economics
British historians
Harvard University alumni
Living people
People educated at Addey and Stanhope School
Fulbright alumni